The White House is the fifth album by The Dead C, released on 29 August 1995 through Siltbreeze.

Track listing

Personnel 
The Dead C – production
Michael Morley – instruments
Bruce Russell – instruments
Robbie Yeats – instruments

References

External links 
 

1995 albums
The Dead C albums